The Latter Seven Masters was a Ming dynasty poetry circle composed of Liang Youyu (梁有誉), Li Panlong (李攀龙), Wang Shizhen (王世贞)、Xie Zhen (谢榛), Zong Chen (宗臣), Xu Zhongxing (徐中行), Wu Guolun (吴国伦).

See also
The Latter Five Poets of the Southern Garden

 Seven Masters
Chinese poetry groups and movements